Nigel Strangeways is a fictional British private detective created by Cecil Day-Lewis, writing under the pen name of Nicholas Blake. He was one of the prominent detectives of the Golden Age of Detective Fiction, appearing in sixteen novels between 1935 and 1966. He also features in a couple of short stories.

Character overview
A gentleman detective Strangeways is an Oxford-educated writer and nephew of an Assistant Commissioner at Scotland Yard. His surname is derived from the Strangeways Prison in Manchester. In the first novel A Question of Proof he is modelled on the poet W. H. Auden but this aspect became less marked as the series progressed. As well as being a private investigator he also works as a literary scholar, producing a study of the Caroline poets amongst other works. Slightly arch he is given to using literary quotes during his investigations, which often pass over the heads of the other characters. His style of detection has been compared to that of John Dickson Carr's Gideon Fell.

During the course of the novels, Strangeways becomes involved in a number of cases reflecting the changing periods of the time. A variety of locations are used for the murder investigations he undertakes including a public school (A Question of Proof, 1935), a brewery (There's Trouble Brewing, 1937), a holiday camp (Malice in Wonderland, 1940) a Whitehall ministry  (Minute for Murder, 1947), a publishing house (End of Chapter, 1957) and a cruise ship (The Widow's Cruise, 1959). The Smiler with the Knife (1939) features a Fascist organisation plotting to overthrow British democracy, while The Sad Variety (1964) focuses on an attempt by British Communists and their Soviet backers to kidnap a professor.

Novels
 A Question of Proof (1935)
 Thou Shell of Death (1936)
 There's Trouble Brewing (1937)
 The Beast Must Die (1938) 
 The Smiler with the Knife (1939)
 Malice in Wonderland (1940)
 The Case of the Abominable Snowman (1941)
 Minute for Murder (1947)
 Head of a Traveller (1949)
 The Dreadful Hollow (1953)
 The Whisper in the Gloom (1954)
 End of Chapter (1957)
 The Widow's Cruise (1959)
 The Worm of Death (1961)
 The Sad Variety (1964)
 The Morning after Death (1966)

Adaptations

Film
The fourth novel in the series The Beast Must Die has been adapted several times for film and television. The film versions include a 1952 Argentine adaptation, and the 1969 French film This Man Must Die.

Television
End of Chapter and The Beast Must Die were separately adapted for the 1960s BBC anthology series Detective. Strangeways was played by Glyn Houston and Bernard Horsfall, respectively.

In 2021, The Beast Must Die was yet again adapted as a television series for BritBox and AMC. Billy Howle starred as Strangeways.

Radio
A Question of Proof and The Beast Must Die were adapted by Michael Bakewell for BBC Radio in 2004. Both dramas starred Philip Franks as Strangeways.

References

Bibliography 
 Blackwell, Laird R. H.C. Bailey's Reggie Fortune and the Golden Age of Detective Fiction. McFarland, 2017.
 Goble, Alan. The Complete Index to Literary Sources in Film. Walter de Gruyter, 1999.
 James, Russell. Great British Fictional Detectives. Remember When, 21 Apr 2009.
 Stanford, Peter. C Day-Lewis: A Life. A&C Black, 2007.

Fictional private investigators
Fictional characters introduced in 1935
Novel series